The Governor of Sheerness Fort and the Isle of Sheppey was a military officer who commanded the fortifications at Sheerness, on the Isle of Sheppey, part of the defences of the Medway estuary. The area had been fortified since the time of Henry VIII, but the Sheerness fortifications were destroyed in 1667 when it was captured during the Dutch Raid on the Medway. It was subsequently re-fortified as Sheerness became the site of a major Royal Navy dockyard, in operation until 1960. The post of Governor was abolished in 1852, when the last governor, Lord Combermere, accepted office as the Constable of the Tower.

Governors of Sheerness

1666–1668: Sir Chichester Wrey, 3rd Baronet
1670–1679: Nathaniel Darrell
1679–1690: Sir Charles Lyttelton, 3rd Baronet
1690–1706: Robert Crawford
1706–1729: Henry Withers
1729–1745: Lord Mark Kerr
1745–1749: John Huske
1749–1752: Charles Cadogan, 2nd Baron Cadogan
1752–1778: Sir John Mordaunt
1778–1811: Francis Craig
1812–1821: Francis Edward Gwyn
1821–1852: Stapleton Cotton, 1st Viscount Combermere

Lieutenant-Governors of Sheerness

1685–1690: Robert Crawford
1690–1725: Thomas King
1725–1762: Richard Evans
?–1782: Henry Hart
1782–1805: Sir James Malcolm, 4th Baronet (died 1805)
1805–1806: Alexander Mair
1806–1813: Thomas Rudsdell
1813–aft. 1841: Robert Walker

References

Military history of Kent
Sheerness